A Bible Commonwealth is a term to describe colonies such as Massachusetts Bay and New Haven, during the majority of the early North American Colonial Period. These Communities are very entangled with the Christian Bible, so much of their society was faith-based. Locally, these communities would pass blue laws, which are laws which made citizens act in accord to the Holy Bible. A blue law could be as simple as no consumption of alcoholic beverages on Sundays or no organized sporting events on Sundays.

References

Religion in the United States